Evan Dylan Whitfield (born June 23, 1977) is a retired American soccer player who spent seven seasons in Major League Soccer.

Player

Youth
Whitfield graduated from Brophy College Preparatory in Phoenix.  He was the 1995 Arizona 5A Player of the Year as he took Brophy to the Arizona high school soccer championship.  Whitfield was also a Parade Magazine All American.  In 1997, Whitfield played for the Tucson Amigos in the USISL.  He played college soccer at Duke University from 1995 to 1998.  In seventy-five games, he scored one goal and added fifteen assists.

Professional
On February 6, 1999, the Chicago Fire selected Whitfield in the first round (eleventh overall) of the 1999 MLS College Draft.  He did not join the Fire, but signed with Belgian club KAA Gent. Not being able to break into the first team in Europe, he came back to MLS and joined the Fire midway through the 1999 soccer season.  He missed most of the 2002 season with a torn ACL).  In 2000 and 2003, the Fire to the US Open Cup in 2000 and 2003.  In December 2004, the Fire traded Whitfield and Dipsy Selolwane to the expansion Real Salt Lake in exchange for Salt Lake's
2005 third round and 2006 second round draft picks.  He played five games for Salt Lake before being released mid-season.

International
Whitfield played for the United States in the 2000 Summer Olympics,

Post playing career
In May 2006, Whitfield graduated from DePaul Law. He then worked as an associate at Schiller, DuCanto & Fleck LLP.  In 2011, Whitfield became a commentator for Chicago Fire games.

References

External links
 
 SoccerTimes: Evan Whitfield
 

1977 births
American soccer coaches
American soccer players
American expatriate soccer players
Chicago Fire FC players
DePaul University College of Law alumni
Duke University alumni
Duke Blue Devils men's soccer players
Footballers at the 2000 Summer Olympics
K.A.A. Gent players
Living people
Major League Soccer players
Olympic soccer players of the United States
Real Salt Lake players
Soccer players from Arizona
Tucson Amigos players
USL League Two players
United States men's under-23 international soccer players
Chicago Fire FC draft picks
Association football defenders
Pan American Games bronze medalists for the United States
Footballers at the 1999 Pan American Games
Medalists at the 1999 Pan American Games
Pan American Games medalists in football